Isopogon gardneri is a plant in the family Proteaceae and is endemic to the southwest of Western Australia. It is a dense, prickly shrub with sharply-pointed, interlocking leaves and hairy, pale pink or yellow flowers.

Description

Taxonomy and naming
Isopogon gardneri was first formally described in 1995 by Donald Bruce Foreman in Flora of Australia from specimens he collected near Hyden on the road to Newdegate in 1984. The specific epithet (gardneri) honours Charles Gardner.

Distribution and habitat
This isopogon grows in shrubland and mallee between Dundinin, Kukerin, Mount Holland and Hatters Hill in the Avon Wheatbelt, Coolgardie and Mallee biogeographic regions in the south-west of Western Australia.

Conservation status
Isopogon gardneri is classified as "not threatened" by the Western Australian Government Department of Parks and Wildlife.

References

gardneri
Eudicots of Western Australia
Plants described in 1995
Endemic flora of Western Australia